Hayes Peak is a conical peak in Antarctica, that reaches  high, rising through the ice slopes  south of Cape Bruce and Oom Bay. It was discovered in February 1931 by the British Australian New Zealand Antarctic Research Expedition under Douglas Mawson, who named it after Reverend James Gordon Hayes.

References

Mountains of Mac. Robertson Land